Missing Girls is a 1936 American film directed by Phil Rosen.

Cast 
Roger Pryor as Reporter Jimmie Dugan
Muriel Evans as Dorothy Benson
Sidney Blackmer as Dan Collins
Noel Madison as Ben Davis
Ann Doran as Ann Jason
George Cooper as Zig
Dewey Robinson as Harry Wilson
Wallis Clark as Senator Benson
Vera Lewis as Ma Barton
Warner Richmond as Ray Hanson
Ben Carter as Pokey
Don Brodie as Chuck Martin

Soundtrack

External links 

1936 films
American crime drama films
American black-and-white films
Chesterfield Pictures films
1936 crime drama films
Films directed by Phil Rosen
1930s English-language films
1930s American films